The  Jonava Synagogue of Merchants is a former synagogue in Jonava.

History 

In 1941 80% of Jonava's population was Jewish and town had seven synagogues.

At present only two synagogues remain and both are not in use. Another remaining Beit Medrash Hagadol Synagogue of Jonava is located closely and listed as protected cultural object. The other synagogues were destroyed when Jonava was attacked by Nazi Germany.

Jonava Synagogue of Merchants was one of the smaller synagogues in Jonava. The main synagogue, also called Red Synagogue of Jonava that was located next to Beit Midrash Hagadol has been destroyed. 

In 2000 the commemorative plaque was hanged on the side of the building.

Current state 

The current appearance of the synagogue differs significantly from its previous appearance and remains much smaller. It is currently used as a shop.

See also
Lithuanian Jews

References

Sources
 Lithuanian Jewish community

Synagogues in Jonava
Buildings and structures in Jonava